James Madison University (JMU, Madison, or James Madison) is a public research university in Harrisonburg, Virginia. Founded in 1908 as the State Normal and Industrial School for Women at Harrisonburg, the institution was renamed Madison College in 1938 in honor of President James Madison and then James Madison University in 1977. It is situated in the Shenandoah Valley, just west of Massanutten Mountain.

History 

Founded in 1908 as a women's college, James Madison University was established by the Virginia General Assembly. It was originally called The State Normal and Industrial School for Women at Harrisonburg. In 1914, the name of the university was changed to the State Normal School for Women at Harrisonburg. At first, academic offerings included only the equivalent of technical training or junior college courses, but authorization to award bachelor's degrees was granted in 1916. During this initial period of development, the campus plan was established and six buildings were constructed.

The university became the State Teachers College at Harrisonburg in 1924 and continued under that name until 1938, when it was named Madison College in honor of James Madison, the fourth President of the United States, whose Montpelier estate is located in nearby Orange, Virginia. In 1976, the university's name was changed again to James Madison University.

The first president of the university was Julian Ashby Burruss. The university opened its doors to its first student body in 1909 with an enrollment of 209 students and a faculty of 15. Its first 20 graduates received diplomas in 1911.

In 1919, Burruss resigned the presidency to become president of Virginia Polytechnic Institute. Samuel Page Duke was then chosen as the school's second president. During Duke's administration, nine major buildings were constructed. Duke served as president from 1919 to 1949.

In 1946, men were first enrolled as regular day students. G. Tyler Miller became the third president in 1949, following Duke's retirement. Major curriculum changes were made and the university was authorized to grant master's degrees in 1954.

Late 20th century 

In 1966, by action of the Virginia General Assembly, the university became a coeducational institution. Ronald E. Carrier, JMU's fourth president, headed the institution from 1971 to 1998. During his administration, student enrollment and the number of faculty and staff tripled, national fraternities were seen on campus such as Tau Kappa Epsilon, Sigma Phi Epsilon, Theta Chi, and others, doctoral programs were authorized, more than 20 major campus buildings were constructed and national publications recognized JMU as one of the finest institutions of its type in America. Carrier Library is named after him.

21st century 

During the first decade of the 21st century, under JMU's fifth President, Linwood H. Rose, the university continued to rapidly expand, not only through new construction east of Interstate 81, but also on the west side of campus. In early 2005, JMU purchased the Rockingham Memorial Hospital campus just north of the main JMU campus for over $40 million. The hospital has since moved, and JMU now occupies the site after having made substantial renovations to it. In June 2005, the university expanded across South High Street by leasing the former Harrisonburg High School building from the City of Harrisonburg. In May 2006, the university purchased the property. The sale was approved in June 2005 for $17 million. The university named the old HHS building Memorial Hall. Recently completed projects include the Rose Library on the east side of campus, which opened on August 11, 2008.

The rapid expansion of JMU's campus has at times created tension in the city-university relationship. In 2006, the local ABC affiliate reported that the university had nearly doubled in size in the preceding 20 years, including purchases of several local properties.

The university has also experienced tension with local residents with occasional clashes between local police and students at a popular off-campus block party. In 2000, a party with about 2,500 students grew out of hand and required a police presence at the Forest Hills townhouse complex on Village Lane. Ten years later, police equipped with riot gear used force to disperse a group of 8,000 college-aged people at the party. Several participants were airlifted to a medical center in Charlottesville to treat their injuries. The university condemned the block party attendees' behavior.

In August 2021, the university received national criticism from conservative political commentators and university alumni after an orientation leader training video and other publications surfaced that supposedly labeled white Americans and Christians as oppressors. In a statement to Fox News, the university stood by the training, saying, "The training was held to help ensure that every student guide for freshmen orientation had the tools and understanding to work with incoming students, who might have a different background than their own."

Academics 
James Madison University is classified among "R2: Doctoral Universities – High Research Activity". It offers 115 degree programs on the bachelor's, master's, educational specialist, and doctoral levels. It comprises seven colleges and 78 academic programs, including the College of Arts and Letters; the College of Business; the College of Education; the College of Health and Behavioral Studies; the College of Integrated Science and Engineering; the College of Science and Mathematics; the College of Visual and Performing Arts; and The Graduate School. Total enrollment in the 2012–13 academic year was 19,927—18,392 undergraduates and 1,820 graduate students. JMU granted 4,908 degrees in 2012–4,096 undergraduate degrees, and 812 graduate degrees.

Phi Kappa Phi was the first academic honor society chartered at JMU. The Honor Society of Phi Kappa Phi (or ΦΚΦ) was established in 1897 to recognize and encourage superior scholarship without restriction as to area of study and to promote the "unity and democracy of education".

On October 2, 2009, JMU was granted a chapter by the Phi Beta Kappa academic honor society.

Colleges 
 College of Arts and Letters
 College of Business
 College of Education
 College of Integrated Science and Engineering
 College of Science and Mathematics
 College of Health and Behavioral Studies
 College of Visual and Performing Arts
 Honors College

Rankings 

U.S. News & World Report ranked JMU the No. 2 public master's-level university in the South (6th overall) for 2019. In the 2018 Washington Monthly college rankings, JMU ranked eighth among master's universities nationwide. Washington Monthly assesses the quality of schools based on social mobility (recruiting and graduating low-income students), research (producing cutting-edge scholarship and PhDs), and service (encouraging students to give something back to their country).

In 2013 BloombergBusiness ranked JMU 15th among all undergraduate business schools in the country for return on investment. In 2014 it ranked JMU's College of Business 40th among undergraduate business programs in the U.S. Kiplinger magazine's 2015 "100 Best Values in Public Colleges" ranked JMU 21st in value in the nation among public colleges and universities.

Campus 

JMU's campus originally consisted of two buildings, Jackson Hall and Maury Hall, which are now known as Darcus Johnson Hall and Gabbin Hall. It has become Virginia's second most photographed location on social media sites like Instagram and Twitter, after Kings Dominion.

The campus is divided into five parts: Bluestone, Hillside, Lakeside, Skyline, and the Village. The Skyline area is on the east side of Interstate 81, while the Bluestone, Hillside, Lakeside, and Village areas of the campus are on the west side. The two sides are connected both by a bridge over, and a tunnel (Duke Dog Alley) under, Interstate 81. Other unique campus features include Newman Lake, a  body of water in the Lake Area next to Greek Row and Sonner Hall, Grafton-Stovall Theater, an on-campus movie theater, and the Edith J. Carrier Arboretum, a 125-acre urban botanical preserve in Harrisonburg and on campus. The arboretum combines naturalized botanical gardens (33 acres) and forest (92 acres), and is Virginia's only arboretum on a public university campus.

The original, historic Bluestone side of campus is located on South Main Street (also known as U.S. Route 11, and historically as "The Valley Pike") and is the heart of the university. Many of the buildings in the Bluestone area have been constructed out of the same stone, known as "bluestone," which is actually a type of limestone that is locally sourced from the surrounding Shenandoah Valley. As the university has grown, the campus has expanded significantly beyond the Bluestone area.

Wilson Hall is the centerpiece of the university's main quadrangle, located in the Bluestone area. It contains an auditorium, administrative offices, and the Community Service Learning Office. The building's cupola has been featured on the university logo, letterhead, and other university stationery and postcards. Completed in 1931, the building was named after President Woodrow Wilson, who was born in nearby Staunton, Virginia.

The  Forbes Center for the Performing Arts opened in June 2010, and serves as the home to JMU's School of Theatre and Dance. It also provides major performance venues and support spaces for the School of Music, and the administrative office for the Dean of the College of Visual and Performing Arts.

Bus service around campus and the city is provided by the Harrisonburg Department of Public Transportation.

John C. Wells Planetarium 

The John C. Wells Planetarium, first opened in 1974, underwent a $1.5 million renovation in 2008. It is now a state-of-the-art hybrid planetarium, the only one of its kind in the world. Its mission is science education and public outreach. It offers free shows to the public every Saturday afternoon and hosts annual summer space camps in July.

East campus expansion 
To the east, across Interstate 81, the expansion has included The College of Integrated Science and Engineering (CISE), the University Recreation Center (UREC), Rose Library (originally named East Campus Library), the Festival Conference and Student Center, the Leeolou Alumni Center, several residence halls, the Chemistry and Physics Building, and University Park, which opened in 2012 off Port Republic Road, combining recreational and varsity athletic fields.

Several new campus construction projects were included in Governor Tim Kaine's $1.65 billion higher education bond package. Kaine's proposal designated more than $96 million for JMU projects. Among the projects included were the construction of a new biotechnology building, Centennial Hall ($44.8 million), and the renovation and expansion of Duke Hall ($43.4 million). The proposal also included $8.6 million as the final instalment payment for the purchase of Rockingham Memorial Hospital.

Forbes Center for the Performing Arts 
Beginning in 2002 JMU began receiving state and private funding to construct a state-of-the-art performing arts complex. The facility is opposite Wilson Hall across South Main Street, and visually completes the Main Quad. It was named the Forbes Center for the Performing Arts in honor of Bruce and Lois Forbes, who gave $5 million to the project. The wing of The Forbes Center dedicated to theater and dance is named the Dorothy Thomasson Estes Center for Theatre and Dance in honor of a $2.5 million gift by the husband of Dorothy Estes. The wing dedicated to music is named the Shirley Hanson Roberts Center for Music Performance in honor of a multi-million dollar gift from the husband of Shirley Roberts. The entire PAC was built at a total cost exceeding $92 million, and opened in June 2010 to house academic offices and performances by the Schools of Theatre, Dance, and Music, and the administrative offices of the College of Visual and Performing Arts.

Renaming historic halls 
In 2020, JMU's Board of Visitors approved the renaming of three historic buildings on the quad that were named in honor of three prominent Virginian Confederate soldiers: Ashby Hall (named after Turner Ashby), Maury Hall (named after Matthew Fontaine Maury), and Jackson Hall (named after Stonewall Jackson). They were given the temporary names of Valley, Mountain and Justice Studies Halls respectively. In 2021, the halls were approved and given new names. Mountain Hall (Maury Hall) was renamed Gabbin Hall after Drs. Joanne V. and Alexander Gabbin, professors at JMU for more than 35 years; Valley Hall (Ashby Hall) was renamed Harper Allen-Lee Hall after Doris Harper Allen and Robert Walker Lee, both notable former staff members at JMU; Justice Studies Hall (Jackson Hall) was renamed Darcus Johnson Hall after Sheary Darcus Johnson, the first black student to graduate at JMU.

In late 2021, ISAT-CS was renamed King Hall in honor of Charlie King's retirement from his position as senior vice president for administration and finance at JMU.

Student life 

The Princeton Review recognized James Madison as one of 81 schools in America "with a conscience", and in 2006 ranked JMU second in the nation behind only the University of Virginia in the number of Peace Corps volunteers it sent from its student body among "medium-sized" universities. And in 2010, the food at JMU was ranked third in the United States. In 2011 the student body was ranked 20th "happiest in the entire nation" by Newsweek and The Daily Beast. These rankings take into consideration the surrounding area's activities, academics, as well as the social scene on campus.

The school has 35 residence halls, ten of which serve as sorority houses. While most residence halls are only for housing, several halls also provide auxiliary services like computer labs and study lounges. All freshmen must live on campus, and a large portion of JMU's on-campus housing is set aside for incoming students. Consequently, most upperclassmen and graduate students live off campus. Continuing students who wish to live on campus must re-apply for housing each year. While occasional exceptions are granted, generally freshmen are not granted on-campus parking permits. Some JMU halls are set-aside as specialized living and learning residential communities. Shenandoah Hall is devoted as an Honors residential experience, Chesapeake Hall is for pre-professional health disciplines, Gifford Hall includes the Roop Learning Community for future teachers, and Wayland Hall is reserved for majors in the art disciplines.

The Breeze 

The Breeze is a student-run newspaper serving JMU since 1922. Published every Thursday, The Breeze provides news and information to the university community, covering topics such as sports, culture, and business. The Breeze has won numerous awards, including a 2012 Online Pacemaker Award, 2012 VPA award for Best in Show for a Non-Daily News Presentation, and a 2012 VPA sweepstakes award.

Clubs and organizations 

James Madison University has over 350 clubs and organizations for students to choose from. This growing list of involvement opportunities provides students with unique experiences that will help them to grow in community and engagement outside of the classroom. At the administrative level, student clubs and organizations fall under the Office of Student Activities and Involvement.

Front-end budgeted 

There are 10 front-end budgeted groups on campus, including Black Student Alliance (BSA), Inter-Fraternity Council (IFC), Latinx Student Alliance (LSA), Madison Equality, National Association for the Advancement of Colored People (NAACP), Panhellenic, SafeRides, Student Ambassadors (SA), Student Government Association (SGA), and University Program Board (UPB). The funds allocated to these organization are voted on by the SGA, with the exception to the SGA budget which is approved separately by the administration. Some FEB organizations are more active than others, causing debate to their status from year-to-year.

Student Government Association 
The JMU Student Government Association (SGA) was founded in 1915 and stood as the first organization on campus. Their goal was to become an organization whose role was to be the voice for the JMU student population and advocate on behalf of the students to the administration and the rest of the community.

SGA consists of two governing bodies, the Executive Council and the Student Senate. The Executive Council consists of the Student Body President, Student Body Vice President, and SGA Treasurer, positions that are elected by the JMU Student Body each academic year. The fourth member of the Executive Council is the Speaker of the Senate who is voted on by the Student Senate. Meanwhile, the Senate consists of Academic Senators and Class Council members who form the various committees within the Senate.SGA organizes many of the university's traditional events, such as Homecoming's Purple Out, Mr. and Ms. Madison, Ring Premiere, the Annual Tree Lighting, the Big Event, and SafeRides. They also vote on Front End Budgeted (FEB) organizational budgets each year as well as allocate contingency funds to other organizations throughout the school year. In 2015, the organization celebrated its 100th year since being founded.

Student Ambassadors 
The JMU Student Ambassadors work alongside the Admissions Office to offer student-led tours for prospective students. Formerly, the Ambassadors were also associated with the Alumni Office until the GOLD Network was established. Ambassadaors are volunteers and are not paid.

University Program Board 
The University Program Board (UPB) puts on large-scale events at JMU, including concerts and themed alternative night-out events like Late Night Breakfast.

SafeRides 
Founded in 2003, SafeRides originated as a program run by the SGA. Inspired by a program at Texas A&M, the organization is a student-led non-profit where unpaid members are dedicated to picking up and driving students home at night at no charge. SafeRides was approved as a FEB organization by the SGA in 2022. To date, they have given more than 100,000 rides.

Greek life 
James Madison University is home to over two dozen social fraternity and sorority chapters, which include members of the North American Interfraternity Conference: Alpha Delta Pi, Acacia, Alpha Phi, Alpha Sigma Phi, Alpha Sigma Alpha, Beta Theta Pi, Alpha Sigma Tau, Delta Sigma Phi, Delta Delta Delta, Delta Tau Delta, Gamma Phi Beta, Delta Upsilon, Kappa Alpha Theta, Kappa Alpha Order, Phi Mu, Kappa Delta Rho, Phi Sigma Sigma, Kappa Sigma, Sigma Kappa, Lambda Chi Alpha, Sigma Sigma Sigma, Phi Gamma Delta (FIJI), Zeta Tau Alpha, Phi Kappa Psi, Pi Kappa Alpha, Pi Kappa Phi, Sigma Nu, Sigma Phi Delta, Sigma Phi Epsilon and Theta Chi.

It is also home to members of the National Panhellenic Conference, National Association of Latino Fraternal Organizations, and National APIDA Panhellenic Association, the Greek organizations that are a part of these umbrella organizations make up the university's Inter-Cultural Greek Council, and consist of: Alpha Phi Alpha, Omega Psi Phi, Phi Beta Sigma, Kappa Alpha Psi, Lambda Phi Epsilon, Lambda Upsilon Lambda, Alpha Kappa Alpha, Delta Sigma Theta, Zeta Phi Beta, Sigma Gamma Rho, Sigma Lambda Upsilon, Sigma Iota Alpha, and Alpha Kappa Delta Phi. A monument dedicated to the members of the Inter-Cultural Greek Council was built in 2022 by the institution's Student Success Center and dubbed "The Yard" in honor of the social justice and community service committed by the organizations.

A cappella 
JMU is home to nine a cappella ensembles: four all-female, three all-male, and two co-educational groups. They are nationally recognized, with many of them featured on the Best of College A Cappella (BOCA) yearly compilation albums. Several of the groups, such as Note-oriety and The Overtones, have gone "viral" for their music videos, "Pretty Hurts" and "Say Love", respectively. Note-oriety has also performed at the White House in Washington, D.C.

Speech Team 
The JMU Speech Team has been recognized by AFA-NIET as one of the top 20 intercollegiate speech teams in the nation. JMU Forensics is the only program in the nation directed by two recipients of AFA's most respected coaching awards: Distinguished Service and Outstanding New Coach.

InterVarsity 
JMU has the largest InterVarsity Christian Fellowship organization in the country.

Club sports

Club soccer 
The JMU Men's and Women's Club Soccer Teams are two of the most decorated club organizations in JMU school history. The men's program most notably won the National Championships in 1999, 2000, and 2009. Similarly, the women have won National Championships in 2009 & 2012. Both the men's and women's teams are also involved in campus philanthropy, including annual community fundraisers, as well as responsibility for the upkeep of roadways through the Adopt-a-Highway program.

Club ultimate 

The JMU Men's Ultimate team, the Flying Hellfish, was founded in 1997. The team is named after the Simpsons episode 22, season 7,  "Raging Abe Simpson and His Grumbling Grandson in 'The Curse of the Flying Hellfish'" Since 2005, the team has hosted an annual tournament known as "The Hellfish Bonanza," which attracts between 12 and 16 teams from across the east coast. Several current and former Hellfish play Ultimate professionally for Major League Ultimate's Washington DC Current and the American Ultimate Disc League's DC Breeze.

Marching Royal Dukes 

James Madison University has the largest collegiate marching band in the nation, with 540 members as of Fall 2022. Nicknamed "Virginia's Finest", the Marching Royal Dukes have performed at venues such as the inaugurations of Presidents Bill Clinton and George W. Bush, the NFC title game between Washington and Dallas in 1983, Bands of America Grand National Championships in 1988 and 1991.  The band has made four appearances in the Macy's Thanksgiving Day Parade, first in 2001, again in 2008, 2013 and most recently in 2018. In the past decade, the band has taken trips to Europe during the school's winter break, featuring Athens, Dublin, Monaco, London, and Rome. During their 2014-15 trip to Europe, the MRDs participated in the 2015 Italian New Year's Day Parade in the Vatican.

Administration

Board of Visitors 

Like all public universities in Virginia, James Madison is governed by a Board of Visitors appointed by the Governor of Virginia. In addition to the 15 members appointed by the governor, the speaker of the Faculty Senate and an elected student representative serve as representatives for the faculty and the student body respectively. The appointed members serve for a maximum of two consecutive four-year terms, while the student representative is limited to two one-year terms. The faculty representative serves for as long as he or she remains the speaker of the JMU Faculty Senate. Some appointed members of note include former presidential candidate Carly Fiorina and former first lady of Virginia, Susan Allen.

President 

Jonathan R. Alger is the sixth and current president of the university. Before being named president, he served as the senior vice president and counsel at Rutgers University.

Presidents of JMU 
 Julian Ashby Burruss (1908–1919)
 Samuel Page Duke (1919–1949)
 G. Tyler Miller (1949–1971)
 Ronald E. Carrier (1971–1998)
 Linwood H. Rose (1999–2012)
 Jonathan R. Alger (2013-Current)

Athletics 

James Madison University's athletic teams are known as the "Dukes." An English bulldog, with crown and cape, and the Duke Dog, a gray canine costume in a purple cape and crown, serve as the school's mascot. The "Dukes" nickname is in honor of Samuel Page Duke, the university's second president. The school colors are royal purple and gold. Madison competes in the NCAA's Division I in the Sun Belt Conference and the Eastern College Athletic Conference.

Beginning in July 2022, the football program began competing in the NCAA's Football Bowl Subdivision (FBS) as part of the Sun Belt Conference. Prior to that, the team participated in the Football Championship Subdivision (FCS) and within the Colonial Athletic Association.

Over 546 varsity athletes compete in football, men's and women's basketball, men's and women's soccer, men's and women's tennis, women's swimming and diving, women's volleyball, baseball, women's lacrosse, field hockey, men's and women's golf, women's cross country and track and field, and softball. James Madison has won five national championships from football (2), field hockey, women's lacrosse and archery, giving the Dukes the second most national titles by a college or university in Virginia.

James Madison University invested heavily in new athletic facilities throughout the tenure of President Linwood Rose. JMU built a new multimillion-dollar baseball and softball field complex that opened in 2010. Additionally, after the last football game of 2009, the university began an expansion of Bridgeforth Stadium that increased seating capacity to approximately 25,000. Construction was completed in time for the 2011 football season.

In 2020, the annual athletic fee for each student was $2,340, which finances three-quarters of Athletic Department revenues.

Baseball 
James Madison's baseball team advanced to the College World Series in 1983, becoming the first Virginia school to do so.

Basketball 
In 2012, the James Madison women's basketball team won a program record 29 games, and advanced to the WNIT National Championship game, where it lost to Oklahoma State University. The Lady Dukes defeated Wake Forest, Davidson College, Virginia, South Florida and Syracuse prior to falling to Oklahoma State. In 2013, head coach Kenny Brooks led his team back to the WNIT defeating NC A&T, NC State, and Fordham before falling to Florida in the tournament's quarterfinals. In 2014, the Dukes posted an overall 29–6 record that culminated with an 85–69 loss to Texas A&M University in the NCAA Championship Round of 32. This marked the ninth consecutive year that the Dukes participated in postseason play and the program's ninth consecutive season with 20 victories, a school record.

In 2013, James Madison University's men's basketball team won the CAA championship title for the first time since 1994. The Dukes then won their first NCAA tournament game in 30 years, defeating Long Island University-Brooklyn. The Dukes fell to Indiana in the second round, 83–62, finishing the season with a 21–15 record.

Field hockey 
The JMU women's field hockey team won the university's first national title in 1994.

Football 
JMU football won the NCAA Division I-AA national title in 2004, with a 13–2 record, and in 2016 with a 14–1 record going undefeated in the FCS. The 2004 squad was the only team in history to win the title after playing four straight road playoff games. Since 2004, the JMU football team has appeared in the playoffs in 2006, 2007, 2008, 2011, 2014, 2015, 2016, 2017,  2018, and 2019. In addition to winning the FCS national championships after the 2004 and 2016 seasons, they were national runners up for the 2017 and 2019 seasons.

Notable alumni

Notes

References

External links 

 

 
Former women's universities and colleges in the United States
Public universities and colleges in Virginia
Educational institutions established in 1908
Universities and colleges accredited by the Southern Association of Colleges and Schools
Education in Harrisonburg, Virginia
1908 establishments in Virginia
Buildings and structures in Harrisonburg, Virginia
Tourist attractions in Harrisonburg, Virginia